Ana is the debut studio album by Cuban-American singer Ana, released by Parc Records in 1987. It features her debut single "Shy Boys", which peaked at No. 94 on the Billboard Hot 100 and No. 23 on the Billboard Dance Chart. The album was released in Japan by CBS Sony as Shy Boys.

The album was made available on streaming platforms on January 28, 2022, with eight bonus tracks including the 1988 stand-alone single "Before I Jump".

Track listing

Personnel 
 Frank Wildhorn – keyboards
 Tim Pierce – guitar
 Michael "Benny" Benedict – saxophone
 Marissa Benedict – trumpet
 Denny Fongheiser – drums
 Lynn Davis – backing vocals
 Alex Brown – backing vocals
 Josie James – backing vocals
 Marcy Levy – backing vocals

References

External links 
 
 

1987 debut albums
Sony Music Entertainment Japan albums